is a 3D fighting video game produced by SNK and is a spin-off of the Fatal Fury series of fighting games. The game was released in Japanese arcades on January 28, 1999. It was one of the last games released for the Hyper Neo Geo 64 system board. It was ported to the Sony PlayStation on June 24 in Japan and November 30 in North America. The game was re-released as a downloadable game for PlayStation 3 and PlayStation Portable via the PlayStation Network in Japan on April 25, 2007.

The game re-tells the story of the original Fatal Fury video game. It introduces Toji Sakata and Tsugumi Sendo to the series, and places Mai Shiranui, Kim Kaphwan, and Li Xiangfei as participants of the original King of Fighters tournament. Ryuji Yamazaki also appears as a mid-boss character and Ryo Sakazaki makes an appearance as Mr. Karate, tying the events of Art of Fighting 2 to this game.

Gameplay
Fatal Fury: Wild Ambition is a 3D fighting game, although the gameplay is similar to that of a 2D fighting game. The button layout for controls are similar to Real Bout Fatal Fury 2, but includes a new move called the Axis Shift. This feature allows players to move their characters left or right using 3D movement. Characters attack using punches, kicks and heavy attacks. Every character also has an assortment of Special Moves and Desperation Moves (now called Super Power Attacks). Super Power Attacks can be performed only when the player's Health Meter is flashing red and does not use the Heat Meter.

Much like in Real Bout Fatal Fury 2, players are able to perform throws, counterattacks and pursuit attacks; they can also taunt and recover quickly after being knocked out.

Fatal Fury: Wild Ambition replaces the Power Meter from Real Bout Fatal Fury 2 with the Heat Meter. The Heat Meter starts at 50% full at the beginning of every match, although it can change between rounds of the same match. Players fill the meter by attacking or taunting their opponent, but taking damage or being thrown decreases the gauge. If a player takes damage but their opponent stops attacking them, the meter will rise to 50% again. When the player fills the Heat Meter, the message "MAX OK" will appear. Players may then perform an Overdrive Power or a Heat Blow. The Heat Meter will be close to empty if either move is used; this can also happen if the player takes too much damage or performs numerous counterattacks. If this happens, a Danger message will appear. If a player takes too much damage with a nearly empty Heat Meter, the player will overheat. This causes the player to get dizzy, becoming vulnerable to the opponent's attack.

A new feature introduced in Fatal Fury: Wild Ambition allows a player to block an attack at the moment it hits, which causes no damage, while the offensive opponent is pushed away.

A novel attack introduced in Fatal Fury: Wild Ambition is the unblockable Heat Blow. A player may stun or launch the opponent into the air and then perform a Heat Blow while being attacked by the opponent to interrupt their attacks. Using a Heat Blow decreases the Heat Meter when the user is close to Danger state.

Fatal Fury: Wild Ambition changes Potential Power (shortened to P. Power in-game) attacks and renames them Overdrive Power. Overdrive Power attacks work differently from the P. Power attacks of the old games. The player can perform Overdrive Power attacks once the Heat Meter is full, regardless of how much health the player has. Using Overdrive Power decreases the Heat Meter close to the Danger point.

Characters
Returning characters:
Terry Bogard
Andy Bogard
Joe Higashi
Mai Shiranui
Kim Kaphwan
Billy Kane
Raiden
Ryuji Yamazaki
Li Xiangfei (secret character in arcade version)

New characters:
Toji Sakata
Tsugumi Sendo

Boss:
Geese Howard

PlayStation secret characters:
Ryo Sakazaki (as Mr. Karate)
Duck King

Reception

The PlayStation version received mixed reviews according to the review aggregation website GameRankings. In Japan, Famitsu gave it a score of 25 out of 40. Also in Japan, Game Machine listed the arcade version in their March 15, 1999 issue as being the third most-successful arcade game of the month.

References

External links
Official website

1999 video games
3D fighting games
Arcade video games
Fatal Fury
Fighting games
Hyper Neogeo 64 games
Multiplayer and single-player video games
PlayStation (console) games
PlayStation Network games
SNK games
SNK Playmore games
Video game remakes
Video games set in the United States
Video games set in Thailand
Video games set in Norway
Video games set in Japan
Video games set in South Korea
Video games set in Hong Kong
Video games set in Australia
Video games set in China
Video games developed in Japan